Ritesh Kumar Gupta is an Indian politician and member of 18th Uttar Pradesh Assembly and 17th Uttar Pradesh Assembly Uttar Pradesh Legislative Assembly.

References

1972 births
Living people
Bharatiya Janata Party politicians from Uttar Pradesh
Uttar Pradesh MLAs 2017–2022
Politicians from Moradabad
Uttar Pradesh MLAs 2022–2027